Battle of Cape St. Vincent may refer to:
 Battle of Cape St. Vincent (1337), a victory of a Castilian fleet over a Portuguese fleet
 Battle of Cape St. Vincent (1606), a victory of a Spanish fleet over a Dutch fleet
 Battle of Cape St. Vincent (1641), a victory of a Spanish fleet over a Dutch fleet
 Battle of Cape St. Vincent (1681), a victory of a Spanish fleet over a Brandenburguese squadron
 Battle of Cape St. Vincent (1693), a victory of a French fleet over an Anglo-Dutch fleet in the Nine Years' War
 Battle of Cape St. Vincent (1719), a victory of a Spanish fleet over a British squadron
 Action of 28 November 1751, a Spanish victory over an Algerian squadron
 Battle of Cape St. Vincent (1780), a victory of a British fleet over a Spanish squadron
 Battle of the Levant Convoy, a French victory over an escorted British convoy
 Battle of Cape St. Vincent (1797), a British victory over the Spanish in the Wars of the French Revolution
 Battle of Cape St. Vincent (1833), a victory of the fleet of Maria II of Portugal over the fleet of Miguel of Portugal in the Liberal Wars

See also  
 Cape St. Vincent (disambiguation)